Grevenbroich station is a junction station in the city of Grevenbroich in the German state of North Rhine-Westphalia. It is located at the junction of the Cologne–Mönchengladbach railway and the Düren–Neuss railway. It is classified by Deutsche Bahn as a category 4 station.

With stops by Busverkehr Rheinland (BVR, a bus operator owned by Deutsche Bahn) in the five bays of the bus station in the station forecourt, Grevenbroich station is the transport hub of Grevenbroich.

History
The first entrance building of Grevenbroich station was demolished after the Second World War, probably as a result of war damage. It was replaced by the existing station building.

The area of the former goods yard, which lay to the west of the platforms, has been reduced dramatically in recent years, so that today it is no longer used. Only a large brownfield area indicates its former size.

With the commissioning of electronic interlocking at Grevenbroich on the Rheydt-Ehrenfeld route in 2007, the Gnf and Gs signal boxes were closed, but they still exist.

The station was partially restored in the period from July to September 2012. A new floor covering with a tactile guidance system for the visually impaired and blind was installed and the entrance area was renovated. The middle entrance door was replaced by an automatically opening door, it allows wheelchair users and people with restricted mobility to enter the station. Deutsche Bahn invested about €300,000 for this project.

Operations

Grevenbroich station is served by the following three services:

Planning
There were plans to replace the former RB 38 service (which ran from Cologne to Düsseldorf via Horrem, Bedburg and Grevenbroich) by a new Rhine-Ruhr S-Bahn line S 18, which would have involved electrifying the Düren–Neuss railway through Grevenbroich station, although this plan is not currently being pursued for the section north of Bedburg. The section from Bedburg to Düsseldorf has been separated and now operates as the Düssel-Erft-Bahn, which has been renumbered as the RB 39.

Platform usage
In general, rail services use the platforms as follows:

Bus routes
The station is served by the following bus routes operated by Busverkehr Rheinland:

References

Railway stations in North Rhine-Westphalia
Railway stations in Germany opened in 1869
1869 establishments in Prussia
Buildings and structures in Rhein-Kreis Neuss